"Bring Your Daughter... to the Slaughter" is the second single from the 1990 Iron Maiden album No Prayer for the Dying.

The song was originally recorded and released by Bruce Dickinson for the soundtrack to A Nightmare on Elm Street 5: The Dream Child, but Steve Harris liked it so Iron Maiden  rerecorded it. It is the only UK number-one single for the band to date, in spite of the fact that it received very little airplay on the BBC. The song also topped the Finnish Singles Chart and reached number six in Ireland.

Background
In 1989, while Iron Maiden were taking a break from touring, Zomba asked Dickinson to write a song for A Nightmare on Elm Street 5: The Dream Child. Teaming up with former Gillan (and future Iron Maiden) guitarist Janick Gers, Dickinson recorded the song, which he claims he wrote "in about three minutes," and the project was expanded into an album, Tattooed Millionaire. Upon hearing the completed track, Steve Harris decided that it would be "great for Maiden" and convinced Dickinson not to put it on his solo album.

The original version of the song, which won a Golden Raspberry Award for "Worst Original Song" in 1989, is, according to Dickinson, "substantially different to the Iron Maiden version," explaining that "the arrangement is identical, but mine's kind of... slinky. Maiden's just really goes for it." Dickinson's original version was included on disc 2 of The Best of Bruce Dickinson in 2001.

Bruce Dickinson said "We're going to release this as a single on Christmas Eve to scare the living daylights out of Cliff Richard". This led to the song competing with Cliff Richard's "Saviour's Day" for the 1990 Christmas number-one, but due to not being officially released until the week after Christmas, went straight to number one on the UK Singles Chart on 30 December 1990. This was in spite of a ban by the BBC, who refused to play the song on Radio 1 and showed at least 2 minutes of the live clip for Top of the Pops. The B-side features cover versions of "I'm a Mover" (originally by Free) and Led Zeppelin's "Communication Breakdown".

In addition to the standard 7" and 12" editions, the single was also released as a special edition 7" flip-top "brain pack" edition.

The video clip features footage from The City of the Dead/Horror Hotel (John Llewellyn Moxey, 1960).

Like most songs from the No Prayer for the Dying album, "Bring Your Daughter to the Slaughter" was rarely played live following the supporting tour, No Prayer on the Road, with the band only performing it on selected dates in 1992, 1993 and 2003.

Track listing 
7-inch single

12-inch single

Personnel
Production credits are adapted from the 7 inch vinyl, and picture disc covers.

Iron Maiden
 Bruce Dickinson – lead vocals
 Janick Gers – lead guitar
 Dave Murray – rhythm guitar, rhythm and lead guitar on tracks 2 and 3
 Steve Harris – bass guitar
 Nicko McBrain – drums

Production
 Martin Birch – producer, engineer, mixing
 Derek Riggs – cover illustrations
 Ross Halfin – photography

Versions

Charts

References

1989 songs
1990 singles
A Nightmare on Elm Street (franchise) music
Bruce Dickinson songs
EMI Records singles
Iron Maiden songs
Number-one singles in Finland
Songs written by Bruce Dickinson
UK Singles Chart number-one singles